American rapper Kendrick Lamar has released five studio albums, one compilation album, one extended play (EP), five mixtapes, 65 singles (including 44 as a featured artist), and three promotional singles. Lamar initially performed under the stage name K.Dot, releasing three mixtapes under that moniker: Y.H.N.I.C. (Hub City Threat: Minor of the Year) (2004), Training Day (2005), and C4 (2009). He gained major attention after the release of his fourth mixtape Overly Dedicated, which was released in 2010. It was Lamar's first full-length project to be released under his birth name and fared well enough to enter the United States Billboard Top R&B/Hip-Hop Albums chart, where it peaked at number 72.

Lamar's debut studio album Section.80, was released on July 2, 2011, and issued on independent record label Top Dawg Entertainment (TDE). It peaked at number 113 on the US Billboard 200 chart. The album's lead single, "HiiiPoWeR", was released prior to the album through iTunes. In mid-2012, Lamar began promoting his second studio album and major label debut, Good Kid, M.A.A.D City. The album's first single, "The Recipe", peaked at number 38 on the US Billboard Hot R&B/Hip-Hop Songs chart. "Swimming Pools (Drank)", the album's lead single, peaked at number 17 on the US Billboard Hot 100 and became his first top 20 hit on the chart. Good Kid, M.A.A.D City was released in October 2012, through TDE, Aftermath Entertainment and Interscope Records. The album received universal critical acclaim and reached number two on the Billboard 200.

On March 16, 2015, Lamar released his third studio album, To Pimp a Butterfly. The album was preceded by two singles, "I" and "The Blacker the Berry", which charted at numbers 39 and 66 on the US Billboard Hot 100, respectively. To Pimp a Butterfly received universal critical acclaim upon release, much like its predecessor, and had global charting success, debuting at number one on the overall albums charts in Australia, Canada, New Zealand, and the United Kingdom, as well as topping the US Billboard 200. On March 4, 2016, Lamar released Untitled Unmastered, a compilation album containing previously unreleased demos that originated during the recording of To Pimp a Butterfly. The compilation album gave Lamar his second chart-topping set in less than a year. On April 14, 2017, his fourth studio album, Damn, was released and reached number one on the Billboard 200, and has since been certified 3× Platinum. The album spawned the singles "Humble", "Loyalty" and "Love", which all reached the top 15 of the US Billboard Hot 100, with "Humble" becoming his first number-one single in the United States as a lead artist. Lamar's fifth studio album Mr. Morale & the Big Steppers was released on May 13, 2022, as his final project under TDE.

Albums

Studio albums

Compilation albums

Soundtrack albums

Mixtapes

EPs

Singles

As lead artist

As featured artist

Promotional singles

Other charted and certified songs

Other guest appearances

Additional songwriting credits

Production discography

2016 
Kendrick Lamar – Untitled Unmastered
4. "Untitled 04 | 08.14.2014."

2018 
Kendrick Lamar and various artists – Black Panther: The Album
1. "Black Panther"
4. "The Ways" (performed by Khalid and Swae Lee)
6. "I Am" (performed by Jorja Smith)
8. "Bloody Waters" (performed by Ab-Soul, Anderson .Paak and James Blake)
10. "Redemption Interlude" (performed by Zacari)
12. "Seasons" (performed by Mozzy, Sjava and Reason) )

2022 
Kendrick Lamar – Mr. Morale & the Big Steppers
1. "United in Grief"
10. "Count Me Out"
13. "Savior (Interlude)"
14. "Savior" (with Baby Keem and Sam Dew) )

See also
 List of songs recorded by Kendrick Lamar
 Black Hippy discography
 List of awards and nominations received by Kendrick Lamar

Notes

References

External links
 Official website
 Kendrick Lamar at AllMusic
 
 

Discographies of American artists
Hip hop discographies
Discography